In mathematics, the Hitchin integrable system is an integrable system depending on the choice of a complex reductive group and a compact Riemann surface, introduced by Nigel Hitchin in 1987. It lies on the crossroads of algebraic geometry, the theory of Lie algebras and integrable system theory. It also plays an important role in geometric Langlands correspondence over the field of complex numbers; related to conformal field theory. A genus zero analogue of the Hitchin system was discovered by R. Garnier somewhat earlier as a certain limit of the Schlesinger equations, and Garnier solved his system by defining spectral curves. (The Garnier system is the classical limit of the Gaudin model. In turn, the Schlesinger equations are the classical limit of the Knizhnik–Zamolodchikov equations).  Almost all integrable systems of classical mechanics can be obtained as particular cases of the Garnier/Hitchin system or their common generalization defined by Bottacin and Markman in 1994.

The Hitchin fibration is the map from the moduli space of Hitchin pairs to characteristic polynomials, a higher genus analogue of the map Garnier used to define the spectral curves.   used Hitchin fibrations over finite fields in his proof of the fundamental lemma.

Description

Using the language of algebraic geometry, the phase space of the system is a partial compactification of the cotangent bundle to the moduli space of stable G-bundles for some reductive group G, on some compact algebraic curve. This space is endowed with a canonical symplectic form. Suppose for simplicity that G=GL(n), the general linear group; then the hamiltonians can be described as follows: the tangent space to G-bundles at the bundle F is 

which by Serre duality is dual to 

 

so a pair 

 

called a Hitchin pair or Higgs bundle, defines a point in the cotangent bundle. Taking 

one obtains elements in 

So taking any basis in these vector spaces we obtain functions Hi, which are Hitchin's hamiltonians. The construction for general reductive group is similar and uses invariant polynomials on the Lie algebra of G.

For trivial reasons these functions are algebraically independent, and some calculations show that their number is exactly half of the dimension of the phase space. The nontrivial part is a proof of Poisson commutativity of these functions.

See also
Yang–Mills equations
Higgs bundle
Nonabelian Hodge correspondence
Character variety
Hitchin's equations

References

Algebraic geometry
Dynamical systems
Hamiltonian mechanics
Lie groups
Differential geometry